is a Japanese footballer who plays for Tochigi SC.

Club statistics
Updated to 23 February 2018.

References

External links

Profile at Shonan Bellmare

1992 births
Living people
Chuo University alumni
People from Atsugi, Kanagawa
Association football people from Kanagawa Prefecture
Japanese footballers
J1 League players
J2 League players
Shonan Bellmare players
Roasso Kumamoto players
FC Ryukyu players
Association football defenders